Owen Township is the name of four townships in Indiana:
Owen Township, Clark County, Indiana
Owen Township, Clinton County, Indiana
Owen Township, Jackson County, Indiana
Owen Township, Warrick County, Indiana

Indiana township disambiguation pages